The Super Mario Bros. Super Show! is an American live-action/animated television series that aired from September 4 to December 1, 1989, in syndication. The series is based on the video games Super Mario Bros. and Super Mario Bros. 2 by Nintendo, and is the first of three television series to be based upon the Mario video game series. The animation was provided by Sei Young Animation.

Each episode consists of live-action segments starring WWF Hall of Fame wrestler "Captain" Lou Albano as Mario and Danny Wells as Luigi alongside a special guest, either as themselves or a character for the segments. The remainder of the program is dedicated to animated stories of Super Mario Bros., starring the voices of Albano and Wells in their respective roles, which were exhibited Monday through Thursday. The Friday episode of The Super Mario Bros. Super Show! was instead accompanied by animated serials of The Legend of Zelda.

A sequel series based on Super Mario Bros. 3 aired the following year, followed by another show based on Super Mario World the year after that.

Premise

The Super Mario Bros. Super Show! revolves around Mario and Luigi, two Italian-American plumbers from Brooklyn. The live-action segments, a satire of contemporary sitcoms, are set in Brooklyn and deal with the peculiarities of running a plumbing business in the late 1980s.

The Super Mario Bros. animated segments feature Mario and Luigi after they accidentally warp into the Mushroom Kingdom while fixing a bathtub drain. Each episode begins with Mario reciting an entry into his "Plumber's Log", then teaming up with Luigi to assist Princess Toadstool and Toad in preventing King Koopa from taking over the Kingdom with a sinister plot, generally one parodying a book, movie, or historical event. Each episode's plot featured characters and situations based upon the NES games Super Mario Bros. and Super Mario Bros. 2, as well as several sound effects and musical cues from both games.  Despite being based on the games, some episodes featured inconsistencies between the serials and the video games. For example, in the animated serials, Mario receives fire powers from a Super Star, whereas the star grants temporary invincibility in the game, with the Fire Flower granting pyrokinesis.

The Legend of Zelda animated segments follow the adventures of the hero Link and Princess Zelda as they defend the kingdom of Hyrule from an evil wizard named Ganon, who somehow came into possession of the Triforce of Power. Most episodes consist of Ganon (or his minions) either attempting to capture the Triforce of Wisdom from Zelda, kidnap Zelda, or conquer Hyrule. In some episodes, Link and Zelda are assisted and accompanied by a fairy-princess named Spryte, who dislikes Zelda as she considers her to be a competitor for Link's affections. Throughout the series, Link is a moaning, self-centred teenager who repeatedly fails to convince Zelda that he deserves a kiss for his heroic deeds. Although Zelda is sometimes the damsel in distress, she is a headstrong, self-sufficient princess who is Link's equal. Link frequently meets Zelda's angry remarks with his sarcastic catchphrase, "Well, excuse me, Princess!"

Cast
 Lou Albano as Mario
 Danny Wells as Luigi

Super Mario Bros. voice cast
 Jeannie Elias as Princess Toadstool
 John Stocker as Toad
 Harvey Atkin as King Koopa

Legend of Zelda voice cast
 Jonathan Potts as Link
 Cyndy Preston as Princess Zelda
 Len Carlson as Ganon
 Paulina Gillis as Spryte
 Colin Fox as King Harkinian
 Elizabeth Hanna as the Triforce of Wisdom
 Allen Stewart Coates as the Triforce of Power

Live-action guest stars

 Lyle Alzado as himself
 Craig Armstrong as Frankenstein's Monster
 Vicki Bakken as Liz/"Queen of England"
 Kay Ballard as herself
 Joe Bellan as himself
 Harry Blackstone Jr. as the Magician
 Brian Bonsall as himself
 Melanie Chartoff as herself
 Philip L. Clarke as Computer Voice
 Patrick Dempsey as the Piranha Plant
 Shabba Doo as himself 
 Donna Douglas as Elle Mae
 Vic Dunlop as himself
 Marty Allen as Imperial Poogah
 Elvira as herself
 Nicole Eggert as herself
 Paul Elder as Alligator Dundee
 Kort Falkenberg as Santa Claus
 Norman Fell as himself
 Martin Gardner as Mikhail S. Gorbachev
 Larry Gelman as Sigmund Fruitcake and himself
 Courtney Gibbs as herself
 Joseph S. Griffo as Mini Mario
 Karen Hartman as herself 
 David Horowitz as himself
 Ernie Hudson as himself
 Magic Johnson as himself
 Elaine Kagan as herself
 Jim Lange as himself
 Cyndi Lauper as herself
 Maurice LaMarche as Inspector Gadget
 Eugene Liebowitz as Dr. Frankenstein
 Pam Matteson as herself
 Danica McKellar as Patty
 Ed Metzger as Albert Einstein
 Fab Morvan as himself
 Rob Pilatus as himself
 Gary Owens as himself
 Willard Pugh as Little Robert
 Sgt. Slaughter as himself 
 Howard Stevens as himself
 Fred Travalena as Elvis Presley
 Arsenio Trinidad as Obi-Wan Cannoli
 Nedra Volz as herself
 James Ward as himself
 Regina Williams as Susanna Ross
 Moon Zappa as herself
 "Rowdy" Roddy Piper as himself

Lou Albano appears as himself in "Captain Lou Is Missing". There is no trick photography—Mario is out of the shop when he enters and remains out until the end of the episode.

Production

History and development
Before the series was conceived, Andy Heyward, the then-CEO of DIC Enterprises, spent about a year trying to convince Nintendo to license the characters. In an interview with USA Today, Heyward said: "The Mario Bros. is such a unique property we had to do it in a different way...We wanted to do a cartoon but also do a show that extended beyond the cartoon". The project originated as Super Mario Bros. Power Hour, a one hour long animation block that would have featured series based on a number of intellectual properties. Concept art was produced for adaptations of Super Mario Bros., The Legend of Zelda, Metroid, Castlevania, Double Dragon, and California Games. With the exception of Mario and Zelda, none of these additional adaptations were ultimately produced. Double Dragon would receive a later adaptation from DIC which aired from 1993 to 1994, but this did not make use of the 1980s concepts and was instead based on the SNES titles released in the interim.

The show premiered in September 1989. To promote the series, Lou Albano appeared on Live with Regis and Kathie Lee in May 1989 with his beard shaven. When the series first aired, it was distributed by Viacom Enterprises and was marketed by MTV. In addition, DiC planned to produce an animated film based on the series. The film was to be released in summer 1990.

In David Sheff's book Game Over, Bill White, the then-director of advertising and public relations for Nintendo, said that the purpose of the television series was to boost awareness of the characters.

Format

Each episode of the program consisted of two live action segments, one at the start and the other towards the end, dubbed Mario Bros. Plumbing, in which Lou Albano and Danny Wells portrayed the roles of Mario and Luigi respectively in comedic story accompanied by a laugh track. These segments involved a celebrity guest star joining the pair, either as themselves or as a character connected to the segment's plot, who were often a popular television star or professional athlete (including WWE (then WWF) stars of the time); such guests included Nedra Volz, Norman Fell, Donna Douglas, Eve Plumb, Vanna White, Lyle Alzado and Magic Johnson.

Alongside guest stars, both Albano and Wells portrayed additional characters in a number of episodes related to Mario and Luigi. In one episode, Albano played as himself, but had to make the character of Mario absent for this to work, while in a number of episodes the pair were joined by Maurice LaMarche in the live-action role of the animated character Inspector Gadget (making it the first appearance of the character in live-action, predating the live-action film by ten years), before his eventual role in voicing the character in Inspector Gadget's Last Case and Gadget & the Gadgetinis. In an interview for Shout! Factory's first DVD release of the show in 2006which exclude some episodes that involved Cassandra Peterson as Elvira, alongside Gadget's second appearance and a few other episodesAlbano stated that filming of the live-action segments involved mainly himself and Wells receiving a central plot and mostly improvising the dialogue as they went along.

The rest of the episode in-between these live-action segments were dedicated to animated serials. For the majority of episodes, between Monday and Thursday, each episode of The Super Mario Bros. Super Show! featured an animated serial of the Super Mario Bros., which both Albano and Wells voiced their respective characters. A total of 52 serials were aired under this schedule until November 16, 1989. For every subsequent Friday, the animated segments consisted of serials of The Legend of Zelda, with scenes featuring during the live-action segments on the preceding Super Mario Bros. Super Show! episodes during the week, and then broadcast as sneak peeks. A total of 13 serials were aired under this schedule, and following November 16, were repeated for the remaining episodes of The Super Mario Bros. Super Show! until its eventual conclusion.

Writing
According to screenwriter Bob Forward, the writing team on the Legend of Zelda segments was given significant freedom to develop the series as they wished, particularly with regards to the script and character design. The fairy character named Spryte was inspired by Forward's childhood obsession with the character Tinker Bell from Walt Disney's animated film Peter Pan. Forward also explained that Link's catchphrase "Excuse me, Princess" was based on a popular Steve Martin comedy routine. He decided to include it in every episode of the series as a way to poke fun at DIC's VP of Creative Affairs, Robbie London, who had forced him to use the phrase. Forward also stated that the relationship between Link and Zelda was influenced by the dynamic between the characters of the American television series Moonlighting, which were portrayed by Bruce Willis and Cybill Shepherd.

The show is one of the few instances of Link having dialogue in The Legend of Zelda franchise. The games intentionally do not give Link dialogue. The Legend of Zelda video game series producer Eiji Aonuma has explained, "since people have played Zelda over the years, they have their ideas of how Link might sound. If we were to put a voice in there that might not match up with someone else's image, then there would be a backlash to that. So we've tried to avoid that".

Songs
Each episode featured two main theme songs used during its broadcast:
 "Plumber Rap" - composed by Shuki Levy, the theme is performed by Albano and Wells, one version to open the show, and another version before the Super Mario Bros. animated segments. Both versions are based on the original "Overworld" theme from the Super Mario Bros. video game. In 2023, it was used for a trailer for the The Super Mario Bros. Movie.
 "Do the Mario" - performed by Albano in front of a greenscreen of the animated show's backgrounds, it acted as the closing theme for The Super Mario Bros. Super Show!.

During each Super Mario Bros. animated segment, a cover of a popular song would be played. When the program was re-released onto DVD in North America, these songs were replaced by instrumentals of songs from The Adventures of Super Mario Bros. 3 and one song from Super Mario World.

Reruns

Club Mario
The first set of reruns of the program were aired during the 1990-1991 TV season, again in syndication, but with significant changes in the live-action format. While it retained the program's original scheduling arrangement of broadcasts and the animated serials of Super Mario Bros. and The Legend of Zelda, the live-action segments of Albano and Wells were replaced with a new continuity of five-minute live-action segments entitled Club Mario.

The format for these segments focused on a new set of characters—Mario-obsessed teenagers Tommy Treehugger (Chris Coombs) and Co-MC (Michael Anthony Rawlins)—hijacking the Super Show's satellite signal (in reality, tapes of the show were sent to stations well in advance). The two were regularly visited by Tommy's annoying sister Tammy (Victoria Delaney), the aptly named Dr. Know-It-All (Kurt Weldon), Co-MC's evil twin Eric (also Rawlins), and a guest star. The segment featured a one-to-two-minute viewing of Space Scout Theater/Spaced Out Theater hosted by Princess Centauri (Shanti Kahn), which was sourced and edited from the children's science fiction television series Photon. In at least one episode, they harass Andy Heyward (playing himself) in the DiC offices.

Club Mario proved unpopular with viewers and was discontinued after one season. Further reruns of the show returned to the use of the original Albano and Wells live-action segments.

Cast

 Chris Coombs as Tommy Treehugger
 Michael Anthony Rawlins as Co-MC/Evil Eric
 Kurt Weldon as Dr. Know-It-All
 Victoria Delaney as Tammy Treehugger 
 Jeff Rose as The Big Kid
 James Abbott as The Band
 Shanti Kahn as Princess Centauri
 Andy Heyward as himself

Mario All Stars
The second set of reruns was created by The Family Channel in 1994 as a programming package entitled Mario All Stars, inspired by the video game title Super Mario All-Stars that was released the previous year. The format of the rerun focused on primarily the cartoons featured in The Super Mario Bros. Super Show! alongside those from the Super Mario World series; prior to being re-edited for this package, the network aired reruns of the program at slower than normal speed and retained the use of the live-action segments before they were discontinued to make way to the package's layout. The rerun was used again by the USA Network in 1997, from January 8 to June 6, before the network replaced it with reruns of Sonic the Hedgehog. The theme song was the end credits theme of Super Mario World.

Although clips from the Super Mario Bros. 3 cartoons were used in promos for the show, none of the show's episodes were featured.

Home media
From 1989 to 1990, Kids Klassics (with the sponsorship of Nesquik) released episodes of the series on VHS. Starting in 1991, Kids Klassics' parent company GoodTimes Entertainment continued releasing episodes on VHS up through 1993. These 1989 releases are noted for being to only releases to contain the original song covers.

In 1994, Buena Vista Home Video under their DIC Toon-Time Video label released the VHS Super Mario Bros. Super Christmas Adventures!, which contained the animated segment "Koopa Klaus" and the live-action segment "Santa Claus is Coming to Flatbush" alongside the Super Mario World episode "The Night Before Cave Christmas".

In 2002, Lions Gate Home Entertainment released a DVD titled Mario's Greatest Movie Moments, which contained 6 episodes as well as two episodes of The Legend of Zelda. The VHS versions of the DVD, Mario's Monster Madness and Action Adventures, includes the same episodes (3 per tape, alongside 1 Zelda episode). None of those releases contained any live-action segments.

In 2004, Sterling Entertainment released Mario Mania on DVD which contained the first week's episodes, consisting of 4 Mario segments and a Legend of Zelda episode. This release however featured the live-action segments and could also be watched on their own. A Question-and-answer with DIC CEO Andy Heyward was also included. Another DVD which consisted of 5 episodes: Mario's Movie Madness was released by Sterling in 2005, but removed the live-action segments.

In 2006, Shout! Factory and Sony BMG Music Entertainment released the series on two 4-disc DVD sets.

These two sets were discontinued in 2012 after Shout!'s deal with Cookie Jar Entertainment expired.

From 2007 to 2009, NCircle Entertainment released several DVD sets of the series. The prints used on these releases were taken from the Shout! Factory boxsets.

NCircle re-released the complete sets in 2012 with the same extras as the Shout! Factory sets, but with the live-action segments removed and "On Her Majesty's Sewer Service" excluded. These releases have the DiC logo replaced with the then-current Cooke Jar logo.

In July 2012, the show was added to Netflix as a part of their instant streaming library. The show was later removed from the service on May 22, 2021.

As of 2020, the series can be purchased digitally to own on VUDU, which is owned by Fandango Media.

UK Home Media history
From 1991 to 1993, Abbey Home Entertainment Distribution released six videos of the "Super Mario Bros. Super Show" with only the animated segmented episodes, the animated segmented intro and the live-action segment of "Do the Mario" in the closing credits.

Maximum Entertainment (Under license from Fox Kids Europe/Jetix Europe) released 4 DVD sets of the series from 2004 to 2007. The first and fourth sets contained 6 episodes, the second contained 5 and the third set contained 3 episodes.

Australia Home Media history
Beyond Home Entertainment released a six-disc box set in the 2000s, with two segments "Rolling Down the River" and "The Unzappables" omitted.

The Legend of Zelda on home media
The Legend of Zelda series has been released separately from the Mario content multiple times, first by Kids Klassics, who released the series on two-episode tapes in four volumes; the gold color of the VHS slipcases matched that of the original NES games.

Lions Gate Home Entertainment also included an episode each on their "Mario's Monster Madness" and "Action Adventures" VHSes; both also included on their DVD counterpart "Mario's Greatest Movie Moments".

Sterling Entertainment released another VHS/DVD titled Ganon's Evil Tower on July 22, 2003, which included three episodes. The DVD release also included 2 episodes of Sonic Underground as a bonus. The second DVD was released on September 27, 2005, titled Havoc in Hyrule, containing five episodes.

The complete Zelda series was released on October 18, 2005, by Shout! Factory and Sony BMG Music Entertainment, with extra bonus features such as interactive DVD games and line art from the series. However, it did not include all of the associated the Super Mario Bros. Super Show! live action segments; some were included as bonus features. This release has been discontinued and is out of print.

NCircle Entertainment eventually re-released Sterling's DVDs, and released another one titled "The Power of the Triforce" on July 22, 2008, which contained five episodes. NCircle re-released the complete series on May 22, 2012.

Reception

Critical response
The show was met with generally mixed reviews from critics, who felt that the storylines were a unique twist to the franchise and that the humor could be considered "funny" but were critical of its live action segments and Albano and Wells’ acting. Upon the series premiere in September 1989, Mike Hughes of USA Today described the series as a "surprising disappointment", opining that the series had "little of the wit and spark" and relied too heavily on slapstick. In a retrospective review for the series' DVD, Mark Bozon of IGN referred the series as "the biggest offender among Nintendo's many embarrassing moments" but thought that the animated shorts were "interesting to look back on". Bozon gave the overall series a 7 out of 10 (while giving the DVD itself a 5 out of 10). Common Sense Media rated the show 1 out of 5 stars, stating that the show with stereotypes has not aged well.

The Legend of Zelda
The Legend of Zelda segments, when reviewed individually, have also received a mixed reception. IGN rated the DVD release of The Legend of Zelda a 3.0 out of 10, or "Bad", citing poor writing, repeated plots, and over the top acting. Link's catchphrase, "Well excuse me, Princess!" is an internet meme and commonly used in-joke used by video game players, especially Zelda fans, and is spoken by Link on 29 occasions throughout the 13 episodes.

James Rolfe of Cinemassacre has shown a more positive response to the series. While acknowledging that the dialogue "can make you cringe", he favored Link and Zelda's characterizations and found the action satisfying. He labeled "The White Knight" as the best episode for showing Link's heroic nature against the more pompous and vain Prince Facade, but described the following episode "Kiss'N Tell" as his least favorite for Link complaining throughout.

Michael Mammano for Den of Geek commented that the series "falls squarely into the category of guilty pleasure" and continued, "it's not very good, but that doesn't stop it from being eminently enjoyable. It's quality nostalgia and, at a total running time of just over three hours, not a bad way to kill an afternoon". However, he also described Link's characterisation as "appalling", describing him as "a whiny, obnoxious, barely competent creep" and also considered the writing and animation to be poor quality.

Nathan Simmons of SVG considered the animation to be "pretty stiff" but also opined that "the greatest sin of this cartoon series might be it's[sic] characterization of Link" who is portrayed as a "creep" and that "for longtime fans, however, it was simply painful to watch".

Luke Plunkett of Kotaku noted "shoddy animation, poor voice work, execrable humour and terrible writing make it one of the decade's worst cartoons" but also commented, "for all its flaws, there's something about it that defies genuine ridicule. Something charming". He responded more positively to the show's faithful presentation of the artwork from the original The Legend of Zelda game and the music stating that it  "featured great renditions of the game's most memorable music, especially the intro's version of the trademark title theme".

Dave Trumbore for Collider described the series as a "20th century mess" and commented: "Despite 30 years of beloved video games that have evolved with each of Nintendo's successive video game systems, the one-and-only 1989 animated series remains a blight on an otherwise impressive record. This disaster, and similar ill-fated animated/live-action adaptations of Nintendo's intellectual properties, left a foul taste in the IP-owners' mouths, essentially locking out any additional adaptations outside of the video game realm".

Writing for Destructoid, Chris Moyse commented that the series "was merely one more harmless entity in a thousand mediocre cartoons", but opined that it harmed the future potential of the franchise because "we most certainly would have had a new Legend of Zelda anime, movie, or live-action series by now".

Ratings
Upon the first week of its premiere, the series had a cumulative 4.1/12 rating/share, making the series the highest rated first-run syndicated series at the time. Within the next two weeks, the series (3.8/11) was beat out by Buena Vista Television's Chip 'n Dale: Rescue Rangers (4.5/11) and faced competition with Claster Television's Muppet Babies reruns.

Legacy
In 2023, an advertisement for The Super Mario Bros. Movie featured "The Mario Rap", the show’s opening theme. The trailer was presented as an advertisement for the Super Mario Bros. plumbing service. A website and phone number were provided as well.

References

External links

 
 The Super Mario Bros. Super Show!

1980s American animated television series
1980s American children's comedy television series
1989 American television series debuts
1989 American television series endings
American animated television spin-offs
American children's animated action television series
American children's animated adventure television series
American children's animated comedy television series
American children's animated fantasy television series
American television series with live action and animation
Animated series based on Mario
Animated television series about brothers
English-language television shows
Television about fairies and sprites
Television series about princesses
First-run syndicated television programs in the United States
Live action television shows based on video games
Television series based on Mario
Television series by CBS Studios
Television series by DIC Entertainment
Television series by DHX Media
Television shows set in Brooklyn